Huapi or Jatunmontepuncu is a mountain located in the Cordillera Blanca mountain range, southwest of Pucaranra, within Huascarán National Park.

References 

Mountains of Peru
Mountains of Ancash Region
Huascarán National Park